Abdoulahy Sangaré (born 14 January 1984) is a Mauritanian international footballer who plays for French club Poissy, as a defender.

Career
Born in Épinay-sur-Seine, France, Sangaré has played club football for Levallois, Saint-Leu, Le Blanc-Mesnil, Paris Saint-Germain B and Poissy.

He made his international debut for Mauritania in 2013.

References

1984 births
Living people
French footballers
Mauritanian footballers
Mauritania international footballers
Levallois SC players
Paris Saint-Germain F.C. players
AS Poissy players
Association football defenders
Sportspeople from Épinay-sur-Seine
Footballers from Seine-Saint-Denis